The Rose Wagner Performing Arts Center is a three-venue arts complex in downtown Salt Lake City, Utah that is home to various performing arts organizations, such as Ririe-Woodbury Dance Company, the Gina Bachauer International Piano Foundation, Plan-B Theatre Company, and the Sundance Film Festival.  It is part of the Salt Lake County Center for the Arts.

In addition to theatres, the center has both permanent and rotating art installations.

History 
The center was opened in 1997. During the 2002 Winter Olympics, the venue was used for the Arts festival and was the location of live tapings and broadcasts of The Tonight Show with Jay Leno.

References

External links 
 Rose Wagner Performing Arts Center, Center for the Arts, Salt Lake County

Buildings and structures in Salt Lake City
Concert halls in Utah
Buildings and structures completed in 1997
Performing arts centers in Utah
Tourist attractions in Salt Lake City
Event venues established in 1997